Le cygne, or The Swan, is the 13th and penultimate movement of The Carnival of the Animals by Camille Saint-Saëns. Originally scored for solo cello accompanied by two pianos, it has been arranged and transcribed for many instruments but remains best known as a cello solo.

Music

The piece is in 6/4 time, with a key signature of G major and a tempo marking andantino grazioso. The slow cello melody is accompanied by almost constant broken chord figurations on the pianos. When performed as a separate movement, not in the context of The Carnival, The Swan is frequently played with accompaniment on only one piano.

This is the only movement from The Carnival of the Animals that the composer allowed to be played in public during his lifetime. He thought the remaining movements were too frivolous and would damage his reputation as a serious composer.

Because of its slow tempo and mostly legato performance indications, the movement is suitable for performance on the theremin and has joined Sergei Rachmaninoff's Vocalise and Jules Massenet's Méditation from his opera Thaïs among the classical works central to the theremin repertoire.

Le cygne illustrates the fleeting nature of beauty with its interpretation of the legend of the "swan song":  A popular (albeit erroneous) belief among the ancient Greeks and Romans, who regarded the swan as the most beautiful of animals, was that the mute swan is silent until its final moments of life, during which it sings the most beautiful of all birdsongs.

Transcriptions and adaptations

In the 1890s, Louis van Waefelghem adapted Le cygne for viola or viola d'amore and piano.  The edition was published by Durand in 1895.
In Leonard Bernstein's famous recording of the piece with the New York Philharmonic the melody is performed on double bass by a 20-year-old Gary Karr.
Montserrat Caballé recorded a version in which she vocalizes sections of the melody accompanied by a piano.
In the early 20th century, Clara Rockmore, the renowned thereminist, performed it on theremin with her sister Nadia Reisenberg accompanying her on the piano.
Steven Mead arranged the piece for Euphonium and Piano in 1995, in the key of E♭ Major.
Tony Renis created lyrics to Le Cygne for the song "Notte Stellata (The Swan)" that appeared on Italian pop-opera trio Il Volo's self-titled debut album.
A jazz version was created by the Italian ensemble No Trio for Cats in 2021 under the title O Cisne de Janeiro.

Uses in choreography

Le cygne is often known as The Dying Swan, after a poem by Tennyson. Inspired by swans that she had seen in public parks, Anna Pavlova worked with choreographer Michel Fokine, who had read the poem, to create the famous 1905 solo ballet dance which is now closely associated with this music. According to tradition, the swan in Pavlova's dance is badly injured and dying. However, Maya Plisetskaya re-interpreted the swan simply as elderly and stubbornly resisting the effects of aging; much like herself (she performed The Swan at a gala on her 70th birthday). Eventually the piece came to be considered one of Pavlova's trademarks.

"Notte Stellata (The Swan)" by Yuzuru Hanyu

Japanese figure skater and two-time Olympic champion, Yuzuru Hanyu, used Il Volo's adaption of Saint Saëns' Le cygne, titled "Notte Stellata (The Swan)", as a program music at exhibition galas of various major skating competitions, including the 2017 World Championships, 2018 Winter Olympics, and the 2019–20 Grand Prix Final. The song was suggested to him by Russian coach Tatiana Tarasova and choreographed by David Wilson from Canada.

Hanyu performed the program as a tribute to the victims of the 2011 Tōhoku earthquake and tsunami. On March 11, 2011, he was practicing at his home rink in Sendai, when the earthquake hit the north-east coast of Japan. The program is a reflection of his own memories, having experienced a blackout at the evacuation center on the night of the disaster: "A person living in Sendai, I had never seen the night sky with stars shining so brightly. It was pitch-dark all at once, there was no electricity, and I was struck by how bright the light of the stars in the dark city really was. I could feel a light of hope." In 2018, Hanyu performed the program at the annual charity event  on Nippon TV. His upcoming ice show with the title Yuzuru Hanyu Notte Stellata 2023 will be a special commemoration event of the earthquake, held at the Sekisui Heim Super Arena in Rifu on 10–12 March, 2023.

Hanyu's program served as inspiration for the ballet performance "Notte Stellata" by the American Crescendo Conservatory, lead by Christina Valdez, at the Kauffmann Performing Arts Center in Kansas City, Missouri on June 16, 2019.

Other choreographies
In 1949 the American synchronized swimmer Beulah Gundling created a routine inspired by Fokine's choreography and entitled The swan to Le cygne by Saint-Saëns.

References

Citations

Books cited

External links
Public-domain scores and recordings in the Petrucci Music Library

Chamber music by Camille Saint-Saëns
1886 compositions
Music about swans
Articles containing video clips